Trial & Error Limited is a Hong Kong video production company that creates online comedic skits.

Yau, who had previously had film and television roles, said his motivation for establishing the YouTube channel was anger that the traditional media failed to allow people in his generation to express themselves. He proposed the channel's creation to Hui and So, who had previous experience running YouTube channels. Six months after its establishment, the YouTube channel received almost 200million views and nearly 200,000subscribers. Trial & Error accrued the most subscribers of all Hong Kong channels in 2021, having in a little over a year of its founding produced 210 videos and accrued over 350,000 subscribers.

Trial & Error's content is heavily influenced by Stephen Chow's work. The group's videos include game shows, music videos, funny sketches, and parodies of popular songs and movies, through which the channel's founders share their thoughts about interactions with others, workplace politics, and what is currently in vogue. Frequently featuring slapstick, mo lei tau humour, and preposterous practical jokes, its videos are analogies of what it is like to be a Hong Kong resident. The group released several satirical songs by parodying a Dear Jane song and lampooning Mirror. In June 2021, they released , which the South China Morning Posts Emily Tsang said alludes to the "inner struggle" that people have over many Hong Kong people moving abroad.

History
The Chinese name of Trial & Error, "試當真", is a film studio term of art meaning that during shooting, the team should film with an attempt mentality and without fear of failure. All three founders were born in Hong Kong. Hui and So, who had been former secondary school classmates classmates, had been making YouTube videos on the Diamond Crew channel. Yau invited the duo, who had also run the YouTube channel CapTV, to join him in founding Trial & Error. Yau had earlier experience in running the YouTube channel Mocking Jer. With prior experience in being a film and television actor, Yau decided to return to making YouTube videos because of the change in climate and the opportunities for creation. He said that anger was the motivating factor for creating the channel because he felt that film and television did not give people in his generation the opportunity for expression. Ho said his motivating factor for cofounding the group was "being poor" and having nothing else to do after he and Hui completing writing the script for the ViuTV television series . In less than a half a year of its founding, and  became group members.

As the founders had little capital, their initial videos were very low-budget and made in their homes. Within half a year of its founding, the group accrued almost 200million views and nearly 200,000subscribers and made enough revenue to rent a studio and pay employees' salaries. It made money through advertising and contributions from the group's followers. After China enacted the Hong Kong national security law in 2020, a number of books and movies were barred and numerous Hong Kong entertainers became fearful about its impact on their work. In this context, the group became popular. Yau said in an interview in 2021, "It's all about how you pop in and out of the grey areas. The grey area is where we survive. If we lose this space, between the red lines, then we quit. Or we die." On 20 April 2021, Trial & Error participated in a livestream with fellow Hong Kong YouTube channels , FHProductionHK, and Pomato to discuss their films. Over 20 people from the four groups took part in the almost four-hour-long livestream, which at peak had 15,000 watchers. In December 2021, YouTube released its Hong Kong channel rankings of who had accrued the most subscribers. Trial & Error, which had gained the most subscribers that year, was ranked "the hottest creator on YouTube", having in a little over a year of its founding produced 210 videos and accrued over 350,000 subscribers. The group had several videos that had accrued over one million videos, including "Don't tell me that she has a boyfriend, "Traffic jam on Tsun Yip Street", and "Channel needs girls.

In April 2022, Yau announced that the group would release a non-fungible token (NFT) called Next Trial Run (NTR) in which purchasers could buy a membership to support the channel. Purchasers would receive benefits including early purchase of tickets for live shows and "artist training classes". According to am730, netizens criticised the move as "exploiting other supporters" and hoped the group would use another method to raise money. The group set a limit of 6,000 tokens that would be sold. In one day, people purchased one-third of the tokens, earning the group  (US$).

Members

Actors
 Neo Yau is a founder of the channel. After receiving a degree from the Hong Kong Academy for Performing Arts, he received attention for his role in the film She Remembers, He Forgets. He wrote, directed, and acted in the ViuTV television series .
  is a founder of the channel. He and So were screenwriters for the ViuTV television series  and are part of the musical duo .
  is a founder of the channel. He and Hui were screenwriters for the ViuTV television series  and are part of the musical duo .
  was recruited to the channel by Neo Yau within six months of its founding. On the ViuTV television show , Yau starred and Lam made a guest appearance. According to Yau, although Lam's character had few speaking lines and primarily expressed himself through facial expressions, Lam showed a "very special sense of humour". He announced in 2021 that he is dating fellow group member Kayan9896.
  is a member of the group. He performed in the film High Noon in his youth and in the 2016 film Weeds on Fire. Sham received a lot of attention after becoming the host of the ViuTV show .
  joined the channel after being a model and receiving a university degree in 2018. After starring in the group's short video "Godfather", she became a channel regular. According to Harper's Bazaar, numerous companies seek her to film commercials including the mixian chain restaurant . She starred in the second episode of the ViuTV short drama .
  was selected to become a group member after the group's recruitment campaign "Channel needs girls". According to Harper's Bazaar in October 2021, she was the female group member who appeared the most in its videos and portrayed pleasant and harmless characters. She competed in the 2021 ViuTV reality television show .
  is a member of the disbanded girl group Super Girls. She was a star in the ViuTV television series , and Louis Koo's artist management company manages her. In Trial & Error videos, she frequently portrays "nosey women" characters.
 Kayan9896 had a breakout performance in the 2020 Trial & Error video "Don't tell me that she has a boyfriend. She acted in Ian Chan's music video "DWBF" and sang  with MC $oHo & KidNey.
  is a member of the group. He played a blowup doll in the group's skit "No masturbation".
  is a member of the group. Born in Malaysia, he moved to Hong Kong when he was three years old. He starred in the 2019 ViuTV television series  as the student union president. He majored in directing at the Hong Kong Academy for Performing Arts. Before becoming an actor, he did behind-the-scenes work as a screenwriter and director. After performing in Limited Education, Tong had almost no work to do and considered becoming a monk by joining a friend who went to Taiwan to take a monk class. On learning that Trial & Error was recruiting behind-the-scenes members, he applied for a role and was selected. Tong started out as an assistant director and owing to his interest and prior experience in acting, he became an actor for the group. In Trial & Error skits, he frequently portrays dapper lovers such as Vincent in "A fairy tale without autumn".
 Wong Tsz Ho is a former member of the group.

Behind-the-scenes members
 Leung Ho-gam, also known as "Match Guy", is a camera operator and an early member of the group.

Videos
Trial & Error makes short videos that cost little to produce and are frequently filmed as mockumentaries. The videos include game shows, music videos, funny sketches, and parodies of popular songs and movies, through which the channel's founders share their thoughts about interactions with others, workplace politics, and what is currently in vogue. Frequently featuring slapstick and preposterous practical jokes, its videos are analogies of what it is like to be a Hong Kong resident, the channel's followers think. In their youth, the YouTube channel's members watched Stephen Chow's films, which feature mo lei tau humour. Their content is heavily influenced by Chow's work.

Released on 26 October 2020, the group's first short film was a spoof of the film Tenet. Titled "The Realistic Tenet: the full version", it shows a YouTuber (played by So Chi Ho) who is no longer making money. A person played by Hui Yin invites the YouTuber to time travel back by two years to kill the instigator of the Third World War, who is played by Neo Yau. The instigator had killed someone which caused a massive string of events that needed to be put in school history lessons. Since secondary schools could not withstand the massive increase in stress, the Third World War began. Apple Daily noted that the Yau-played instigator had a mole inked on his face, which the newspaper thought alluded to Chan Tong-kai. The fight scenes between So and Yau happen on different timelines, which pays homage to similar scenes in Tenet. The film received a positive reception from netizens. One of Trial & Error's earliest videos was "Don't tell me that she has a boyfriend. The story was told from the perspective of an otaku who wants to date a goddess and stars Kayan9896 as the female lead. Kayan9896 is filmed from many angles from the otaku's perspective, leading to her receiving a lot of attention from netizens who called her "the Hong Kong Tzuyu.

After Trial & Error members Yau, Hui, and So played people from the future in the ViuTV television series , the group made a spoof titled "140520". The 940920 actors Terrance Lau, Cecilia Choi, and  performed in the parody, which spoofed scenes from Beyond the Dream as well as from 940920 and its prequel Leap Day. The group spoofed the television series My Date with a Vampire in a video released 4 July 2022 titled "The vampire and I have a misunderstanding". The Hong Kong Economic Times praised the parody, writing, "In addition to the high fidelity of the modeling, even the shooting skills, angles and editing of fighting scenes are all at the same level as the previous work."

Trial & Error made a television commercial for Hang Seng Bank titled "Try to be mature, try to be serious" starring Yau, Hui, and So. The ad aired on ViuTV on 10 May 2022 and was posted on the YouTube channels of the bank and the group. Using the multiverse concept, the commercial shows the three men travelling through the worlds of different films and Trial & Error videos to encourage viewers to do more experimentation.

Songs
On 3 December 2020, the group released a parody of the Dear Jane song "You & Me", which was renamed to "Traffic jam on Tsun Yip Street", and had its lyrics rewritten in collaboration with the lyricist . Showing commuters on buses and minibuses, the song discusses the massive gridlock in Kwun Tong District. , who had starred in the Dear Jane music video, starred again in the Trial & Error music video, and scenes in the spoof music video allude to the original's scenes. The parody became viral and received a lot of discussion.

In June 2021, Hui and So released the Cantonese song , which means "see you later" in English. In its music video, which evokes the music style of the 1980s, people are celebrating at a party. Feeling desolate, a person played by So Chi Ho longs to walk away during the partying, singing, "Let me go first, that's that. Let's play again next time!" People convince So to remain but after he decides stay they do not pay attention to him. The song's enthusiasts, who were primarily young people, started saying the lyrics in place of saying "goodbye". According to the South China Morning Posts Emily Tsang, the song alludes to the "inner struggle" that people have over many Hong Kong people moving abroad. For weeks, the song topped the ranking of Cantonese songs played on Spotify.

To lampoon the musical group Mirror, which has a dozen members, Hui and So released the song "Black Mirror". In reference to the group's prevalence on Hong Kong's billboards and promotions in the MTR and on buses, the song's lyrics say, "They're here. They're here. You see them everywhere." The duo sing, "There shouldn't be only 12 handsome men in the world. There should be at least 14."

Shows
At the Kowloonbay International Trade & Exhibition Centre's Star Hall, Trial & Error performed twice on October 26, 2021, in a show titled "Trial & Error's first anniversary show: the in-person version". The venue had 3,600 seats, and to combat scalpers they sold seats using the Dutch auction methodology, which is rarely used in Hong Kong. By the 24th day, tickets would cost  (US$), but by the fourth day, all seats had been purchased with 13 being sold on the first day, four on the second day, and 61 on the third day. The group earned  (US$) in revenue from the seat purchases, analysts estimated.

Lasting for around two hours each, the shows featured skits, dancing, singing, and stand-up comedy. Yau danced with the child actor  and did a stand-up comedy set where he joked, "I care the most about the audience in the back, because the audience in the front will say I did well no matter what I say. But the audience in the back will write bad things about me on the Internet when I do something wrong." In 2022, one of the test questions for the economics section of the 2022 Hong Kong Diploma of Secondary Education (HKDSE) discussed how Trial & Error had sold tickets for their shows. The multiple choice question asked test takers about the rationale for the price, having them choose between answers of "distributing" and "rationing".

Reception
The South China Morning Posts Emily Tsang said Trial & Error "tapped on enthusiasm among fans for their anti-idol sarcasm and witty use of Cantonese slang". Gary Tang Kin-yat, a Hang Seng University of Hong Kong social science assistance professor, said, "They have produced some high-quality works that are excellent in plot and humour, as well as film-making techniques and use of language." Tang said that Trial & Error became popular with Hong Kong people after having invested significant time and having gone through other platforms. The psychologist Peter Chan Kin-yan said, "Their stories or parodies often use metaphors or employ a clever, self-mocking way to discuss an embarrassing topic, which ... puts people at ease. In a way, the messages in their comedies appeal to our inner fears and desires." The BBC stated, "Its videos are unique in humor, irony and metaphor, and are very popular among the younger generation." Harper's Bazaars Ba Ze wrote, "The works of Trial & Error are funny and in line with the current values, arousing the resonance of many young people and allowing them to become popular."

References

External links
 Official website
 

Cantonese-language YouTube channels
Comedy-related YouTube channels
Entertainment companies of Hong Kong
Hong Kong YouTubers
Video production companies
YouTube channels launched in 2020